The Kawagoe Line is a railway line in Japan operated by the East Japan Railway Company (JR East), which connects the cities of Saitama, Kawagoe, and Hidaka in Saitama Prefecture.

Services
On the western section between Kawagoe and Komagawa, about half of all trains travel through to/from  via the Hachikō Line.

Except for a few rush-hour trains that start and terminate at Minami-Furuya, all eastbound trains from Komagawa and westbound trains from Ōmiya terminate at Kawagoe. Passengers wishing to travel beyond Kawagoe must change trains there.

Station list
 All stations are located in Saitama Prefecture.
 Passengers bound for Ōmiya or Komagawa must change trains at Kawagoe. However, during early mornings and evenings, some trains leaving Kawagoe depot provide service from Minami-Furuya to Komagawa. 
 All rapid or commuter rapid trains to/from the Saikyo Line stop at every station on the Kawagoe Line. 
 Trains can pass each other at stations marked "∥", "∨", and "◇"; they cannot pass at stations marked "｜".

Saitama - Kawagoe

Kawagoe - Komagawa

Rolling stock
 E233-7000 series 10-car EMUs x 38 (Kawagoe Line/Saikyo Line/TWR Rinkai Line services since 30 June 2013)
 209-3500 series 4-car EMUs x 5 (Kawagoe Line/Hachiko Line services since 7 May 2018)
 E231-3000 series 4-car EMUs x 6 (Kawagoe Line/Hachiko Line services since 19 February 2018)
TWR 70-000 series 10-car EMUs x 8 (Kawagoe Line/Saikyo Line/TWR Rinkai Line services)

The electric multiple unit (EMU) fleet used on Kawagoe Line services is based at Kawagoe Depot (close to Minami-Furuya Station). The sole 205 series set was withdrawn from service in October 2016, then in 2019 seven more E233-7000 series sets entered service, bringing the total number of E233-7000’s to 38.

From 2017, former E231-0 series ten-car sets based at Mitaka Depot for use on Chuo-Sobu Line services were reformed and converted to become four-car E231-3000 series sets based at Kawagoe for use on Kawagoe Line and Hachiko Line services. The first set entered revenue service on the line on 19 February 2018.

From 2018, former 209-500 series ten-car sets based at Mitaka Depot for use on Chuo-Sobu Line services were reformed and converted to become four-car 209-3500 series sets based at Kawagoe for use on Kawagoe Line and Hachiko Line services.

Rolling stock previously used
9600 class steam locomotives (until September 1969)
KiHa 07 diesel cars (from 1955)
KiHa 15 DMUs 
KiHa 20 DMUs 
KiHa 35 DMUs (1964 – September 1985)
103-3000 series EMUs (from March 1985 until October 2005)
103-3500 series EMU (from March 1996 until March 2005)
205 series 10-car EMUs x 32 (Kawagoe Line/Saikyo Line/TWR Rinkai Line services until October 2016)
205-3000 series 4-car EMUs x 5 (Kawagoe Line/Hachikō Line services until July 2018)
209-3000 series 4-car EMUs x 4 (Kawagoe Line/Hachiko Line services from March 1996 until February 2019)
209-3100 series 4-car EMUs x 2 (Kawagoe Line/Hachiko Line services from 17 April 2005 until January 2022)

, all Saikyo Line 205 series sets have been removed from service.

History

Line opening
A line linking Ōmiya with Kawagoe and continuing to the Hachikō Line at Komagawa was first proposed in March 1920. Construction work started in September 1935, with the line opening on 22 July 1940.

Switch to diesel
Services were initially steam hauled, but diesel multiple unit trains were introduced from 1 June 1950. The final steam-hauled passenger train ran on 30 September 1969.

Electrification
The line was electrified (1,500 V DC) from 30 September 1985, and through running commenced to and from the Saikyō Line, which opened at the same time. The tracks were doubled between Ōmiya to Nisshin, and a new EMU depot was opened close to Minami-Furuya Station. A special "Kawagoe Line Diesel Sayonara" train ran on the line on 3 November 1985.

Hachikō Line through services
Through services between Kawagoe and Hachiōji on the Hachikō Line began on 16 March 1996 following the electrification of the southern section of the Hachikō Line between Komagawa and Hachiōji.

References

External links

 Stations of the Kawagoe Line (JR East) 

 
Lines of East Japan Railway Company
Rail transport in Saitama Prefecture
1067 mm gauge railways in Japan
Railway lines opened in 1940